Peter Hodgkinson may refer to: 
 Peter Hodgkinson (architect), a senior partner at Ricardo Bofill Taller de Arquitectura (born 1940)
 Peter Hodgkinson (sculptor), a British sculptor (born 1956)

Disambiguation pages